Nicole Murgia is an Italian actress best known for her role of Cristina Giorgi in the Italian television series Tutti pazzi per amore.

She married footballer Andrea Bertolacci on 23 December 2015; her brother Alessandro is also a footballer.

Selected filmography

Cinema 
 Ricordati di me
 Nessun messaggio in segreteria

Televisione 
 Don Matteo 2 
 Distretto di Polizia 4
 Nati ieri
 Tutti pazzi per amore
 Din Don – Bianco Natale

Web TV 
 Youtuber$

References

External links 

 
 Nicole Mugira at Rotten Tomatoes

Year of birth missing (living people)
Living people
Actresses from Rome
Association footballers' wives and girlfriends